A smart bomb or guided bomb is a precision-guided munition designed to achieve greater accuracy.

Smart bomb may also refer to:
 A precision-guided munition
 Smart Bomb Interactive, a video game development studio based in Salt Lake City, Utah
 Smart Bomb (video game), a 2005 puzzle video game for the PSP
 Smartbomb (book), a 2005 book about the video game industry
 "Smartbomb", a song by BT from the album Movement in Still Life
 Smartbomb (EP), an EP by Left Spine Down
 Smart Bomb (EP), an EP by Thrush Hermit